The All-America Football Conference (AAFC) was an American football league which challenged the established National Football League (NFL) from 1946 to 1949.

From 1946 to 1948, the AAFC determined its champion in a title game between the winners of its two divisions.  In 1948, a special playoff game was needed to break a first-place tie in one of the divisions.

In 1949, the league contracted to a single division, so it determined its champion by a four-team single-elimination tournament.

The Cleveland Browns won all four AAFC titles, however their domination and the lack of balance that it demonstrated ultimately hurt the league by diminishing attendance.

AAFC playoff records, as with AAFC records in general, are recognized by the Pro Football Hall of Fame, but are not included in the NFL's record book.

1946

Championship Game
Cleveland Browns 14, New York Yankees 9

December 22, 1946, at Municipal Stadium, Cleveland, Ohio

Scoring
N.Y. – FG H. Johnson 21
CLE. – Motley 2 run (Groza kick)
N.Y. – Sanders 2 run (kick blocked)
CLE. – Lavelli 16 pass from Graham (Groza kick)

1947

Championship Game
Cleveland Browns 14, New York Yankees 3

December 14, 1947, at Yankee Stadium, New York, New York

Scoring
CLE. – Graham 1 run (Groza kick)
N.Y. – FG H. Johnson 12
CLE. – Jones 4 run (Groza kick)

1948

Division Playoff
Buffalo Bills 28, Baltimore Colts 17

Dec. 12, 1948 at Municipal Stadium, Baltimore, Maryland

Scoring
BAL. – FG Grossman 16
BUF. – O'Connor 5 pass from Ratterman (Armstrong kick)
BAL. – Mertes 9 run (Grossman kick)
BAL. – Mertes 1 run (Grossman kick)
BUF. – Gompers 66 pass from Ratterman (Armstrong kick)
BUF. – Baldwin 25 pass from Ratterman (Armstrong kick)
BUF. – Hirsch 20 pass interception (Armstrong kick)

Championship Game
Cleveland Browns 49, Buffalo Bills 7

Dec. 19, 1948 at Municipal Stadium, Cleveland, Ohio

Scoring
CLE. – E. Jones 3 run (Groza kick)
CLE. – Young 18 fumble return (Groza kick)
CLE. – E. Jones 9 pass from Graham (Groza kick)
CLE. – Motley 29 run (Groza kick)
BUF. – Baldwin 10 pass from Still (Armstrong kick)
CLE. – Motley 31 run (Groza kick)
CLE. – Motley 5 run (Groza kick)
CLE. – Saban 39 interception return (Groza kick)

1949

First-round Games
Cleveland Browns 31, Buffalo Bills 21

Dec. 4, 1949 at Municipal Stadium, Cleveland, Ohio

Scoring
CLE. – Lavelli 51 pass from Graham (Groza kick)
CLE. – FG Groza 31
BUF. – Tomasetti 4 pass from Ratterman (Adams kick)
BUF. – Mutryn 8 pass from Ratterman (Adams kick)
CLE. – E. Jones 2 run (Groza kick)
BUF. – Mutryn 30 pass from Ratterman (Adams kick)
CLE. – D. Jones 49 pass from Graham (Groza kick)
CLE. – Lahr 52 interception return (Groza kick)

San Francisco 49ers 17, New York Yankees 7

Dec. 4, 1949 at Kezar Stadium, San Francisco, California

Scoring
S.F. – Lilywhite 40 run (Veterano kick)
N.Y. – Howard 1 run (H. Johnson kick)
S.F. – FG Veterano 38
S.F. – Garlin 10 pass from Albert (Veterano kick)

Championship Game
Cleveland Browns 21, San Francisco 49ers 7

Dec. 11, 1949 at Municipal Stadium, Cleveland, Ohio

Scoring
CLE. – E. Jones 2 run (Groza kick)
CLE. – Motley 63 run (Groza kick)
S.F. – Salata 23 pass from Albert (Veterano kick)
CLE. – D. Jones 4 run (Groza kick)

References

Total Football: The Official Encyclopedia of the National Football League

All-America Football Conference